"Cheating on You" is a song by American singer-songwriter Charlie Puth. It was released as a digital download and for streaming on October 2, 2019. The song was written by Puth and Jacob Kasher.The song resurged in 2021 gaining over 600k average views on spotify in the following year, it marks Puth's 9th biggest hit till date.

Background
Before he released the song, Puth said on his Twitter account, "The final song out of this trilogy is called Cheating On You...and I promise the song doesn't sound as the title suggests."

Music video
A music video to accompany the release of "Cheating on You" was first released onto YouTube on October 1, 2019. The video was directed by Tyler Yee. At the start of the video it shows a message that reads, "This song is not about a person. It's about a feeling I've never had." The video was filmed in New York City.

Track listing

Charts

Weekly charts

Year-end charts

Release history

References

2019 songs
Charlie Puth songs
Songs written by Jacob Kasher
Songs written by Charlie Puth